Ezdimir Buttress (‘Rid Ezdimir’ \'rid 'ez-di-mir\) is the ice-covered buttress rising to 1719 m on the northwest side of Detroit Plateau on Davis Coast in Graham Land, Antarctica.  It is situated between tributaries to Temple Glacier, and has steep and partly ice-free southwest, northwest and northeast slopes.

The buttress is named after Ezdimir Mountain in Western Bulgaria.

Location
British mapping in 1974.

Maps
James Ross Island. Scale 1:250000 topographic map. BAS 250 Series, Sheet SQ 21-22/1. British Antarctic Survey, 1974.
 Antarctic Digital Database (ADD). Scale 1:250000 topographic map of Antarctica. Scientific Committee on Antarctic Research (SCAR). Since 1993, regularly upgraded and updated.

Notes

References
 Bulgarian Antarctic Gazetteer. Antarctic Place-names Commission. (details in Bulgarian, basic data in English)
 Ezdimir Buttress. SCAR Composite Gazetteer of Antarctica

External links
 Ezdimir Buttress. Copernix satellite image

Mountains of Graham Land
Bulgaria and the Antarctic
Davis Coast